Gabriela Dabrowski and Luisa Stefani defeated Anna Blinkova and Natela Dzalamidze in the final, 6–1, 6–2 to win the doubles tennis title at the 2022 WTA Indian Open.

Peng Shuai and Sun Tiantian were the champions from when the event was last held in 2008 in Bangalore, but they have since retired from professional tennis.

Seeds

Draw

Draw

References

External links
 Main draw

Chennai Open - Doubles